Coleman Bridge is a historic Ball-patent pipe pony truss bridge in Windsor, Massachusetts. It is the only known surviving in situ bridge of its type, one of about two dozen built in western New England. It is located on an abandoned stretch of Windsor Bush Road which crosses Phelps Brook in what is now a remote upland section of Windsor. The bridge was located near farms owned by the Coleman family, giving the bridge its name. The bridge type was invented by Charles H. Ball, an entrepreneur from nearby Peru who developed the idea of using pipes as structural elements of bridges over smaller bodies of water. Only three instances are known to exist, two of which were (as of 2000) disassembled and in storage.

The bridge was probably built in the 1890s, when Ball was at his height as a bridge builder, and did regular work for the Windsor highway department. The bridge elements were manufactured in Ball's small East Windsor shop. It was built on the site where there had previously been a wooden bridge, and spans . The top cords of the pony truss are pipes  in diameter, with doubled iron rods functioning as the truss's bottom chord. The bridge originally had wooden stringers, which were at some point replaced by iron ones. The wooden floor of the bridge is also a replacement. The bridge is accessible on foot, but is impacted by the construction of beaver dams nearby and underneath the structure. It was listed on the National Register of Historic Places in 2000.

See also
List of bridges documented by the Historic American Engineering Record in Massachusetts
List of bridges on the National Register of Historic Places in Massachusetts
National Register of Historic Places listings in Berkshire County, Massachusetts

References

External links

Road bridges on the National Register of Historic Places in Massachusetts
Bridges completed in 1894
Bridges in Berkshire County, Massachusetts
Historic American Engineering Record in Massachusetts
National Register of Historic Places in Berkshire County, Massachusetts
Truss bridges in the United States
Metal bridges in the United States